Hanuman River Railway bridge is a three-span railway bridge crossing the Hanuman River. It is situated in Kabin Buri District, Prachinburi Province, Thailand, on the Eastern Line Railway, near Kabin Buri railway station. There are three spans.

Features
It is a three-span truss bridge. The second span is different and taller than the first and third span.

References

External links
 Photos of the bridge (2008) 

Railway bridges in Thailand
Bridges completed in 1970
Truss bridges